College of Veterinary Science and Animal Husbandry, Anand is a college for the study of veterinary medicine in Anand, Gujarat, in india.

History
The college was established on 16 August 1964 by the government of Gujarat, becoming a part of Gujarat Agriculture University in 1974. Now, it is a constituent college of Anand Agricultural university.

Campus
The campus is spread over 63 acres of land with 18 departments, four research stations, a molecular genetics laboratory, a veterinary hospital, an instructional farm, a library, and indoor and outdoor sports facilities.

Co-curricular activities
 Student's Representative Council
 Rotaract Club
 Nature Club
 NCC
 NSS

Other activities
 Clinical and infertility camps
 Ambulatory health services
 Diagnostic services
 Refresher/short-term courses for veterinary officers
 Seminars on livestock health and production

Student counselling
Candidates are called for counselling by the Admission Committee and also for verification of physical fitness, original mark sheet, certificates etc. before admission and registration. The candidates have to produce a medical certificate of physical fitness in the form prescribed by the Universities from a Registered Medical Officer.

Departments

 Livestock Products Technology
 Department of Animal Biotechnology
 Veterinary Anatomy
 Animal Physiology
 Animal Bio Chemistry & Bio Technology
 Veterinary Microbiology
 Livestock Production & Management
 Animal Genetics & Breeding
 Veterinary Parasitology
 Veterinary Surgery & Radiology
 Animal Reproduction, Gynaecology & Obstetrics
 Veterinary Pathology
 Veterinary Medicine
 Veterinary Pharmacology
 Reproductive Biology Research
 Poultry Science
 Animal Nutrition
 Teaching Veterinary Clinical Service Complex
 Veterinary Public Health
 Department of Animal Biotechnology
 LIvestock Research Station

AAVCA is the name of the Alumni Association of Veterinary College Anand.

References

Universities and colleges in Gujarat
Veterinary schools in India
Educational institutions established in 1964
Education in Anand district
1964 establishments in Gujarat
Animal husbandry in Gujarat